Admiral Hugh Rodman KCB (6 January 1859 – 7 June 1940) was an officer in the United States Navy who served during the Spanish–American War and World War I, later serving as the Commander-in-Chief, U.S. Pacific Fleet from 1919 to 1921.

Biography
Born at Frankfort, Kentucky, Rodman graduated from the Naval Academy in 1880.

In 1899, he participated in scientific explorations in the Pacific under the direction of Alexander Agassiz. Then, in 1900, he returned to Alaska for work investigating its fisheries. From 1901 to 1904 he commanded  in Hawaiian waters.

From 1907 to 1909, he attended the Naval War College and served as Lighthouse Inspector, 6th Naval District. Duty as Marine Superintendent of the Panama Canal followed in 1914, and in 1915 he commanded . During 1916 he served on the General Board.

Promoted to the rank of rear admiral in 1917, Rodman served as commander of Battleship Division 9, Atlantic Fleet, in his flagship, New York. Ordered to European waters late in the year, his division joined the British Grand Fleet at Scapa Flow and became the 6th Battle Squadron, British Grand Fleet, under Admiral Sir David Beatty. For the remainder of World War I, Admiral Rodman commanded his division in operations in the North Sea.  For this service, he was invested as a Knight Commander of the Order of the Bath by King George V and was awarded the Navy Distinguished Service Medal.

Returning to the United States after the Armistice, he served with the Atlantic Fleet until July 1919 when he became Commander-in-Chief, Pacific Fleet. Detached in 1921, he served as Commandant, 5th Naval District, from 1921 to 1922, interrupting that duty once for a mission to Peru as Minister Plenipotentiary and Envoy Extraordinary. During 1922–23, he was senior member of a board to formulate administrative policy for all shore stations and on reaching retirement age, 64, was transferred to the retired list.

After his retirement, he continued to serve the United States and the navy on various missions which included, in the summer of 1923, accompanying President Warren G. Harding on his ill-fated inspection of Alaska. In 1937, he represented the U.S. Navy at King George VI's coronation ceremonies in London.

Admiral Rodman died at Bethesda, Maryland and is buried at Arlington National Cemetery.

Awards
Navy Distinguished Service Medal
Dewey Medal
Spanish Campaign Medal
Philippine Campaign Medal
World War I Victory Medal

Honors 
 Grand Cordon in the Order of Leopold.
 United Kingdom:Knight Companion of the Order of the Bath

Namesakes
The destroyer , the transport , and the U.S Navy Station Rodman in the Panama Canal Zone were named for him.

See also

 Admiral William Sims Commander of U.S. Naval Forces in Europe

References

1859 births
1940 deaths
United States Navy personnel of the Spanish–American War
United States Navy personnel of World War I
Admirals of World War I
Burials at Arlington National Cemetery
Naval War College alumni
People from Frankfort, Kentucky
United States Naval Academy alumni
Navy Midshipmen football players
United States Navy admirals
Honorary Knights Commander of the Order of the Bath